Refaat El-Sayed (born 11 February 1946 in Egypt) is a businessman of Egyptian and Swedish nationality, and convicted criminal. At the beginning of the 1980s, he took command of a small biotech company, Fermenta, which he quickly turned into one of the success stories of the Stockholm stock exchange. El-Sayed soon became Sweden's richest man, and made the fortune of his employees and shareholders. A charismatic leader, he was a favourite of the media, and in December 1985 he was named "Swede of the year" by the TV news program Rapport. The following month, Fermenta announced a partnership with Swedish industrial giant Volvo. El-Sayed was at the peak of his fame.

The fall from grace was brutal: just one month later, El-Sayed was accused of lying about his academic qualifications, as he had falsely asserted he was a Doctor of Science. The partnership with Volvo was broken. He was later sentenced to six years in prison for fraud. In 1992, El-Sayed became the CEO of another biotech company, Hebi Health Care.

Early life 
El-Sayed was born 11 February 1946 in a small town in Northern Egypt. As a teenager, he showed an early interest in microbiology.<ref group=sr> 02:16 – 02:24 : Refaat El-Sayed föddes 1946...</ref> He immigrated to Sweden in 1966, and started working as a laboratory assistant at the Fiskeby paper mill in Norrköping. He then resumed his studies, at first in Stockholm, before joining the University of Agricultural Sciences at Ultuna near Uppsala.

After a few years, he left Sweden for the United States, where he worked as a consultant for SDS Biotech. He would later claim to have studied at UC Davis in California, though there is no proof he ever did so - the university denies having any student with that name. His ambition was to start a biotechnology company, and to develop his inventions and patents in the field of water purification. In the mid-1970s, he acquired his first company, which he renamed Mikrochem.

In 1981, he turned his attention to Fermenta, a subsidiary of Astra located in Strängnäs near Stockholm. Fermenta's main output was raw materials used for the production of antibiotics, an activity considered at the time of low strategic value. It was an ageing, money losing business, which Astra was eager to get rid of. El-Sayed became the new owner after taking a loan of one million kronor from Handelsbanken. But in order to develop itself, Fermenta needed even more money, and El-Sayed decided to go public, at a time that marked the start of a bull run for the Stockholm stock exchange.

 Success 
In the first half of the 1980s, the Fermenta stock price rose steadily, which allowed El-Sayed to embark on a campaign of acquisition. In early 1985, he notably bought Pierrel from Italian industrial Vittorio de Nora. Pierrel's activities were diversified; they included pharmacy, with the production of antibiotics, chemicals, with aspartam, etc... El-Sayed's plan was to retain only the activities he was interested in, and to sell other operations for a profit. Through this campaign of acquisition, he was hoping to turn Fermenta into a giant in the biotechnology sector. Just after taking the control of Pierrel, El-Sayed presented his new board of directors, which included big names of the Swedish business scene, such as Ove Sundberg from KemaNobel, Gösta Bystedt and Simon Liliedahl from Electrolux, and advertising guru Leon Nordin.

After an aborted attempt at buying Swedish giant Kabi Vitrum, El-Sayed turned his attention to the American firm for which he had worked in the 1970s: he bought SDS Biotech for 500 million kronor. The Fermenta stock price rose from 85 to 230 kronor between January and December 1985. The Swedish media started to show interest in the Fermenta phenomenon – it had taken only a few years for the company to become a major actor in the pharmaceutical industry. El-Sayed was presented as an unusual corporate leader: at barely 10 000 kronor, his salary was at par with that of a worker of the Strängnäs plant, he was living in a flat in the outskirts of Stockholm, and he played amateur football in the Swedish third division. On 22 December 1985, the TV news program Rapport named him « Swede of the year » for his success as Fermenta's chief, for his unconventional management style, and for « putting the light on the important role played by immigrants in the Swedish society. »

On 8 January 1986, El-Sayed appeared in front of TV cameras besides Pehr G. Gyllenhammar, the most powerful man in Sweden's industry. Volvo and Fermenta announced a deal, through which Volvo was exchanging its participations in two pharmaceutical companies, Soneson and Pharmacia, against a 20% stake in Fermenta. With this deal, Fermenta was becoming a world giant in the pharmaceutical industry, with a market capitalisation of four billion kronor. The news made the front page of the Financial Times. It was said that it had taken El-Sayed only 10 minutes to win the favours of Gyllenhammar. The Fermenta stock reached a new high at 325 kronor, while El-Sayed was at the peak of his glory. He would remain there for a little over a month. A.B. Fermenta. New York Times. 10 January 1986.

 The DSc scandal 
In February 1986, researcher and environmental activist Björn Gillberg, whom El-Sayed knew from his time at Ultuna, publicly accused Fermenta of pollution at the site of the Strängnäs plant. Gillberg also accused El-Sayed of lying about his academic qualifications, and of falsely claiming he was a Doctor of Science. Journalists who tried to verify these allegations discovered that according to some sources, El-Sayed was awarded his Doctor degree in California, while according to others, he had earned it in Sweden.

This scandal had disastrous effects for El-Sayed and Fermenta. That he was not a Doctor was in itself a mere detail, which on one hand stripped him of the « genius » aura that had so far surrounded him, but on the other hand added to the myth of the self-made billionaire. But his 48 hours of awkward denial cost him the trust of the markets, of the business world.

 The fall 
After the DSc scandal, the markets were unforgiving. The Fermenta stock price dropped, and the Volvo and Pharmacia shares were also slammed. El-Sayed was soon compelled to leave his position as CEO, while Volvo reminded in a press release that the partnership agreement was not yet finalised. Fermenta's new CEO Ove Sundberg granted Volvo full access to the company's books. El-Sayed remained optimistic in his public comments, but it became clearer and clearer that Volvo was going to backtrack, which was eventually confirmed on 25 February. Volvo cancels Fermenta link. New York Times. 26 February 1986. It was a financial disaster for El-Sayed, who had personally bought four millions of Fermenta shares with the intention of exchanging them with Pharmacia. The drop in the stock price meant he was soon riddled with debts amounting to more than a billion kronor.

For Fermenta however, optimism was still de rigueur: it showed a profit for the first quarter of 1986. But in May, . Nevertheless, two weeks later, El-Sayed made a comeback at the top of Fermenta. In the hope of clearing his debts, he attempted to sell the company to Montedison, and later to Bayer, but with no success.

In December 1986, Fermenta's auditors discovered extensive irregularities in Fermenta's financial statements. Refaat El-Sayed was sentenced to five years in prison by the district court in 1989, as well as banning him from engaging in commercial activities on charges of fraud, gross indebtedness against creditors, unfair benefit of creditors and breaches of the Securities Market Act. In the following year, the Sveahov Court raised the sentence to six years. El-Saayed was released in 1992. Fermenta's board was also sentenced to daily fines for environmental crime.

 Hebi Health Care 
Refaat El-Sayed was released from jail in May 1992, after serving one half of his sentence. In 1997, he became the CEO of Hebi Health Care, a company in the sector of fine chemicals and pharmaceuticals. Hebi Health Care went public in 1999, and was listed on the Nordic Growth Market from 2002. Refaat El-Sayed's charisma had not yet vanished: Hebi Health Care soon gathered 45 000 shareholders, and its market capitalisation reached one half billion kronor.

Hebi Health Care relocated part of its activities to Egypt, but was soon to face supply problems.

 References P3 dokumentär om FermentaOn 22 October 2006, the Swedish radio station P3 broadcast a documentary produced by Kristofer Hansson and Fredrik Johnsson about the Fermenta story.Other references Further reading 
  Christer Petersson. Refaat och spelet kring Fermenta. Gedin. 1987. .
  Sven-Ivan Sundqvist. Refaat & Fermenta : dramat och aktörerna''. Författarförlaget. 1987. .

In the English-speaking press 

The New York Times (and others) wrote many articles about El-Sayed and Fermenta during the 1980s.
  Steve Lohr.  A fall from grace in biotech. New York Times. 3 March 1986.

1946 births
Living people
1980s in Sweden
Financial scandals
Egyptian businesspeople
Swedish businesspeople
Egyptian billionaires
Swedish billionaires
Egyptian emigrants to Sweden
People who fabricated academic degrees
University of California, Davis alumni